Sultan Ahmed (Hindi:सुल्तान अहमद) was an Indian film director and producer in the 1970s and 1980s, famous for his films on dacoits such as Heera, Ganga Ki Saugandh, and Daata.

Early life
Sultan Ahmed who was famous for his films on dacoits hails from a Maulana family who were landlords based in Lucknow. Sultan Ahmed's grandfather was a very famous Persian poet & his father also belonged to the same field. Sultan's paternal uncle – Wajahat Mirza was the writer of one of the greatest Hindi movies, Mughal-e-Azam.

Career
Sultan Ahmed started his career as a chief assistant to K Asif on Dilip Kumar – Madhubala starrer Mughal-e-Azam. Sultan Ahmed also assisted K Asif on his other movies like Love and God & Sasta Khoon Mehenga Paani. Sultan Ahmed had this fascination for dacoits and was known for movies based on them. In his career, he directed actors like Rajesh Khanna & Jeetendra, Amitabh Bachchan, Sunil Dutt, Mithun Chakraborty for movies like Dharam Kanta, Ganga Ki Saugand, Heera & Daata respectively.
Sultan Ahmed also founded Sultan Productions which is now headed by his wife – Farah Sultan Ahmed. Farah has been elected an E.C Committee member of IMPPA between 2002 & 2008. Farah has big plans of reviving the banner with several prestigious projects.

Death
Sultan Ahmed died in Tehran while on a pilgrimage tour to Iraq and Iran in 2002.  He is survived by two sons Ali Akbar Ahmed, Ali Abbas Ahmed and wife Farahdeeba.  He was previously married to Shammi (actress), but the marriage ended in divorce after 7 years.

Filmography
Sultan Ahmed's first film, Heera featured Sunil Dutt, Shatrughan Sinha & Asha Parekh. The music was scored by Kalyanji-Anandji and was declared a silver jubilee at the box office. After this movie, Sultan Ahmed directed Pyar Ka Rishta for producer Tony Walker. Then he went on to sign Amitabh Bachchan & Rekha for Ganga Ki Saugand. The movie was released in 1978 and explored the subject of untouchables, and it also became a box-office hit. The biggest box office hit of his career was Dharm Kanta in 1982 with Raaj Kumar, Rajesh Khanna and Jeetendra in the lead. In 1989, Sultan Ahmed directed Daata starring Mithun Chakraborty, Padmini Kolhapure & Shammi Kapoor. In 1995, Sanjay Dutt starrer Jai Vikraanta was released with music from Anand–Milind. Sultan Ahmed's glorious life as a filmmaker saw his wonderful association with music legends Kalyanji Anandji.

Producer
 Jai Vikraanta  (1995)
 Reyasat (1993)
 Daata  (1989)
 Dharam Kanta (1982)
 Ganga Ki Saugand (1978)
 Heera (1973)

Director
 Jai Vikraanta (1995)
 Reyasat  (1993)
 Daata (1989)
 Dharam Kanta (1982)
 Ganga Ki Saugand  (1978)
 Heera (1973)
 Pyaar Ka Rishta (1973)

Writer
 Daata (1989)

Achievements and awards
Sultan Ahmed received the first award for his film Heera from Uttar Pradesh Film Journalist Association (U.P.F.J.A.) in 1973. Later in the year 1979, Sultan Ahmed received a certificate of merit for Ganga ki Saugand from Tashkent, Russia. Sultan Ahmed was also awarded K. Asif Memorial Award for "Big Thinking" from Bombay Film Awards Association for the year 1982 – 83. Punjabi Kala Sangam award was presented to Sultan Ahmed by the President of India Shri. Gyani Zail Singh for Daata.
From the year 1990 to 1994, Sultan Ahmed served the country's oldest & renowned association of film producers – Indian Motion Picture Producers Association (IMPPA) as Senior Vice-president and later was elected unanimously as President of IMPPA for the years 1994 to 1998

References

External links

2002 deaths
Hindi-language film directors
1938 births
Hindi film producers
Artists from Lucknow
Film producers from Uttar Pradesh
Film directors from Uttar Pradesh